Norway competed at the 1968 Summer Paralympics in Tel Aviv, Israel. The team finished thirteenth in the medal table and won a total of 9 medals; 5 gold, 13 silver and 1 bronze.

Medalists

See also 
 Norway at the Paralympics
 Norway at the 1968 Summer Olympics

References

Nations at the 1968 Summer Paralympics
1968
Paralympics